Juan Alfonso de la Cerda (1295 – August 7, 1347) was Lord of Gibraleón, Huelva, Real de Manzanares and Deza. 

He was the son of Alfonso de la Cerda, grandson of Ferdinand de la Cerda. His mother was Matile of Brienne, daughter of John I of Brienne, Count of Eu. He married Maria Alfonso de Portugal (illegitimate daughter of King Denis of Portugal).

He served under Alfonso XI of Castile in the Siege of Algeciras (1342-1344), which culminated in the city's surrender in 1344.

References 

14th-century Castilians
1347 deaths
1295 births